James Rowlandson DD (1577 – 9 May 1639) was a Canon of Windsor from 1638 to 1639

Career
He was educated at Queen's College, Oxford where he graduated BA in 1602, MA in 1605, BD in 1614 and DD in 1636.

He was appointed:
Chaplain to Bishop Bilson of Winchester
Vicar of Southampton St Cross and Holyrood 1611
Rector of Bramdean 1615
Rector of East Tisted, Hampshire 1615
Master of the Hospital of St Mary Magdalene, Winchester
Chaplain to King Charles I

He was appointed to the eighth stall in St George's Chapel, Windsor Castle in 1638 and held the canonry until 1639.

Notes 

1577 births
1639 deaths
Canons of Windsor
Alumni of The Queen's College, Oxford